Curtner station is a light rail station operated by Santa Clara Valley Transportation Authority (VTA). Curtner station is served by the Blue Line of the VTA Light Rail system. The station is located within the median of State Route 87, where it crosses over Curtner Avenue in San Jose, California.

Connecting transit
VTA Bus:

References

External links

Santa Clara Valley Transportation Authority light rail stations
Santa Clara Valley Transportation Authority bus stations
Railway stations in San Jose, California
Railway stations in the United States opened in 1987
1987 establishments in California
Railway stations in highway medians